The following is a list of squads for each national team competing at the 2018 AFC U-16 Championship. The tournament took place in Malaysia, between 20 September and 7 October 2018. It was the 18th U-16 age group competition organised by the Asian Football Confederation.

Players born on or after 1 January 2002 were eligible to compete in the tournament. Each team had to register a squad of minimum 18 players and maximum 23 players, minimum three of whom must have been goalkeepers (Regulations Articles 24.1 and 24.2). The full squad listings are below.

Group A

Malaysia 
Malaysia named their squad on 14 September 2018.

Manager: Lim Teong Kim

Japan 
Japan named their squad on 3 September 2018.

Manager: Yoshiro Moriyama

Thailand 
Manager: Thongchai Rungreangles

Tajikistan 
Tajikistan named their squad on 12 September 2018.

Manager: Zaynidin Rakhimov

Group B

North Korea 
Manager: Pak Jong-chol

Oman 
Oman named their squad on 6 September 2018.

Manager: Yaqoob Al-Sabahi

Yemen 
Yemen named their squad on 20 September 2018.

Manager:  Magdy Shalaby

Jordan 
Jordan named their squad on 8 September 2018.

Manager: Abdallah El Qutati

Group C

Iran 
Iran named their squad on 9 September 2018.

Manager: Abbas Chamanyan

Vietnam 
Vietnam named their squad on 17 September 2018.

Manager: Vũ Hồng Việt

India 
Manager: Bibiano Fernandes

Indonesia 
Indonesia named their squad on 30 August 2018.

Manager: Fachry Husaini

Group D

Iraq 
Iraq named their squad on 18 September 2018.

Manager: Faisal Aziz

South Korea 
South Korea named their squad on 13 September 2018.

Manager: Kim Jung-soo

Australia 
Australia named their squad on 6 September 2018.

Manager: Trevor Morgan

Afghanistan 
Manager: Sayed Hadi Kazemi

References

2018 AFC U-16 Championship